Olympus M.Zuiko Digital ED 8 mm f/1.8 Fisheye Pro is an optically corrected fisheye lens.

Description 
M.Zuiko Digital lenses are offered as exchangeable lenses for the Micro Four Thirds system (MFT). The ED 8 mm f/1.8 Fisheye Pro is available since 2014. This lens has a focussing ring and it is water and dust proof.

The anti-reflective coating of the lens with 0.3 times normal focal length has 17 lenses in 15 groups. The front lens is made of extremely high refracting glass in order to allow a small construction. The ED 8 mm f/1.8 Fisheye Pro has an excellent image quality with low aberration. At fast aperture sizes (up to f = 2.8) there is visible vignetting.

Owing to the large aperture size the lens is suitable for night sky and together with an underwater lens port for underwater photography. Furthermore, it is qualified for architecture and nature photography. Because of the short close focus distance it can be used for macro shots.

Comparison 
Compared to other camera systems with differing normal focal lengths, and therefore different image sensor sizes, the following equivalent values apply to lenses with appropriate properties as the M.Zuiko 8 mm f/1,8 within the Micro-Four-Thirds system (MFT). With the parameters given in the table in all camera systems the photographer will get the same angle of view, depth of field, diffraction limitation and motion blur:

External links 
 M.ZUIKO DIGITAL ED 8 mm 1:1.8 Pro

References 

Olympus M.Zuiko Digital lenses